Re-education through labor (RTL; in Chinese, laodong jiaoyang 劳动教养, abbreviated láojiào 劳教) is a system of administrative detentions in the People's Republic of China.  The estimated number of detainees in re-education through labor camps is anywhere from 300,000 (China Labor Bulletin, 2007) to 2 million (Laogai Research Foundation, 2006).  There are at least 310 camps in China (China Daily, 2007).

Anhui province

Beijing municipality

Chongqing municipality

Fujian province

Gansu province

Guangdong province

Guangxi province

Guizhou province

Hainan

Hebei province

Heilongjiang province

Henan province

Hubei province

Hunan province

Inner Mongolia

Jiangsu province

Jiangxi province

Jilin province

Liaoning province

Ningxia region

Qinghai province

Shaanxi province

Shandong province

Shanghai municipality

Shanxi province

Sichuan province

Tianjin municipality

Tibet Autonomous Region

Xinjiang province

Yunnan province

Zhejiang province

Sources

Unless otherwise specified, information is from the following source:

China-related lists